"Conundrum" is the 14th episode of the fifth season of the American science fiction television series Star Trek: The Next Generation, and the 114th episode overall. It aired in syndication starting February 10, 1992.

In this episode, the entire crew suffers complete memory loss after an unknown alien ship scans the Enterprise. Although unable to recall their names or duties, they quickly realize that somehow they still know how to operate the starship. In the confusion, no one notices that Kieran MacDuff, identified by the ship's computer as the Enterprise'''s executive officer, is someone they've never seen before. The computer also provides evidence that they are on a mission to cross into Lysian space and destroy that species' central command, as well as any Lysian vessel that attempts to stop them. Somehow, it all seems wrong to Picard, but his new first officer insists he must follow his orders.

"Conundrum" won an Emmy award for Outstanding Individual Achievement in Special Visual Effects.

Plot
After being scanned by an unknown alien spaceship, the Enterprise crew discover that their memories, along with those of the ship's computer, have been partially erased. Although they retain their practical knowledge and skills, none of the crew can remember who their crewmates are, and have forgotten their own identities. Mysteriously, during the scan, an additional crewmember, in an officer's uniform, with the rank of commander, has joined the group on the bridge.

The bridge crew attempts to gain control of the situation, and Worf—wearing his baldric— assumes because he is decorated that he is the captain of the ship, and assumes command. Data, with the memory files identifying who he is unavailable, and based on where he was when the scan happened, assumes the job of bartender in Ten Forward.

After considerable time, the ship's computer memory is finally reached, and La Forge brings up the manifest of the senior staff members. Among the bridge crew is listed the mysterious new member who is identified as Commander Kieran MacDuff, the executive officer. The computer also reveals what is apparently the Enterprise's mission: According to the orders, the Enterprise is part of a fleet of vessels fighting a decades-old war with the Lysians. Their current assignment is to destroy the Lysian central command headquarters, which they are to do while maintaining communications silence.
Worf apologises to Picard for taking over but is assured he and the rest of the crew were simply doing their best.

In the meantime, Ensign Ro concludes that she and Commander Riker are likely romantically connected, and pursues this relationship. The two had been bickering about rank and proper procedure prior to the memory loss. Meanwhile Deanna Troi also realizes she has feelings for the commander and finds evidence which supports their past relationship.

Doctor Crusher works to restore the memories of the crew, a process complicated when it's found that the medical records for the crew have been destroyed. She tries an experimental procedure on MacDuff, who apparently reacts poorly to the treatments, but later smiles when Crusher turns away.

Continuing toward the target, the Enterprise encounters a Lysian ship, which is easily destroyed. Picard becomes concerned with how mismatched the firepower of the Enterprise is compared to her supposed enemies. Picard complains to MacDuff that he feels as though he has been given a weapon, taken into a room and told to shoot a stranger. Ultimately, when faced with the Lysian central command, drastically incapable of fighting them off and with 15,311 people on board, Picard calls off the mission, stating that he does not fire on defenseless people. Angered by this action, MacDuff attempts to take control of the Enterprise, throwing Lt Worf across the bridge when Worf attempts to restrain him. Riker then fires a phaser at MacDuff, revealing that MacDuff is some manner of alien. MacDuff struggles to activate the ship's weapons, but Riker and Worf defeat him by simultaneously firing their phasers at him, causing him to collapse.

Dr. Crusher is able to restore memories to the crew. The alien is identified as a Satarran, who are at war with the Lysians so they plotted to hijack the Enterprise and tilt the war in their favor.

Riker remains uneasy when he encounters Troi and Ro in the Ten Forward bar. Troi assumes his actions resulted from subconscious desires and curtly informs him that "if you're still confused tomorrow, you know where my office is."

Reception
In 2014, IO9 rated "Conundrum" the 82nd greatest episode of Star Trek.

In 2017, Screen Rant ranked "Conundrum" as the 14th most hopeful episode of all Star Trek episodes up to that time. The episode was noted for being optimistic, because of the crew's compassion, and for its humor.

In 2017, SyFy rated the Satarrans featured in this episode, one of the top 11 most bizarre aliens of Star Trek: The Next Generation.

In 2019, Den of Geek recommended rewatching this episode as background for Star Trek: Picard.

In 2020, Screen Rant ranked "Conundrum" the 14th best episode of Star Trek: The Next Generation'', pointing out it "gave viewers a chance to know the characters a bit more."

Releases 
The episode was released in the United States on November 5, 2002, as part of the season five DVD box set. The first Blu-ray release was in the United States on November 18, 2013, followed by the United Kingdom the next day, November 19, 2013.

References

External links

 

Star Trek: The Next Generation (season 5) episodes
1992 American television episodes
Emmy Award-winning episodes
Television episodes about amnesia
Television episodes directed by Les Landau